The pale-eyed thrush (Turdus leucops) is a species of bird in the family Turdidae.

Taxonomy
Its genus is controversial. Some taxonomists place this species in the genus Platycichla based on morphology. The South American Classification Committee of the American Ornithologists' Union places it in the genus Turdus, as does the International Ornithological Committee.

Distribution and habitat
It is found in Bolivia, Brazil, Colombia, Ecuador, Guyana, Peru, and Venezuela. Its natural habitat is subtropical or tropical moist montane forests.

References

Further reading

pale-eyed thrush
Birds of the Northern Andes
Birds of Venezuela
pale-eyed thrush
pale-eyed thrush
Taxonomy articles created by Polbot